Willy Breitling was a Swiss watchmaker, businessman and the former president of the Swiss luxury wristwatch manufacturer Breitling SA.

Willy Breitling is credited for the invention and introduction of the first two-pusher chronograph wristwatch in 1934.

Accomplishments

Amongst Willy Breitling's many pioneering achievements, was the establishment of the Huit Aviation Department in 1938.

Willy Breitling was also responsible for bringing to market the patented model Chronomat in 1940, characterized by a patented rotating slide rule for technicians and scientists.

In 1953, Wily Breitling launched the 'Premier line' and opened a new segment for the company, targeting the high-end market with wristwatches in precious metals and elegant shapes, instead of the rugged pilot and military timepieces the brand was famous for.

In 1936, Willy Breitling introduced an on-board chronograph for airplanes, later used by over 30 airlines and has since supplied the Royal Air Force with cockpit clocks for their aircraft.

Two of the more intricate highlights of the following decade were the introduction of the Duograph line, which was introduced in 1944 and featured a split-second complication, and the Datora collection, which was introduced immediately after the war and is characterized by its calendar and moon phase display.

In the 1950s, celebrating his 25th anniversary as head of the family business, W. Breitling launched the SuperOcean collection.

Personal life 
Willy Breitling was the only son of Gaston Breitling and took over the helm of the family business (Breitling SA) after his death in 1927.

References

Books 

 Breitling Highlights – by Henning Mützlitz, 2011  
 Breitling: The History of a Great Brand of Watches (1884 – present) 
 Breitling. Die Geschichte einer großen Uhrenmarke. 1884 bis heute; Author: Benno Richter; 
 Das ZEITGEFÜHL-Uhrenbuch; Author: Gerd-Lothar Reschke; 

Swiss businesspeople
Swiss watchmakers (people)
1927 deaths